A chronology of the different lineups in the history of Motown singing group The Miracles.

Group chronology

The Five Chimes

1955-1956                              
Smokey Robinson
Ronnie White                            
Pete Moore
Clarence Dawson
James Grice

The Matadors

1956-1956
Smokey Robinson
Ronnie White
Pete Moore
Bobby Rogers
Emerson "Sonny" Rogers (cousin of Bobby, brother of Claudette, replaced Dawson and Grice)

1956-1958
Smokey Robinson
Ronnie White
Pete Moore
Bobby Rogers
Claudette Rogers (replaced her brother Emerson "Sonny" Rogers, who was drafted into the U.S. Armed Forces)

The Miracles (the classic lineup)

1958-1966
Smokey Robinson
Ronnie White
Pete Moore
Bobby Rogers
Claudette Robinson (Claudette and Smokey married in 1959)
Marv Tarplin (guitars)

Smokey Robinson & the Miracles

1966-1972  
(same members; group name changed to spotlight lead singer)

Smokey Robinson 
Ronnie White
Pete Moore
Bobby Rogers
Marv Tarplin
Claudette Robinson (though she remained as a non-touring member of The Miracles performing background vocals, she retired from live performing from 1964 until Smokey's last show with the Miracles in 1972)

The Miracles

1972-1973
Billy Griffin (Smokey Robinson departs, replaced by Billy Griffin; Claudette also retires)
Ronnie White
Pete Moore
Bobby Rogers
Marv Tarplin

1973-1978
Billy Griffin
Ronnie White
Pete Moore
Bobby Rogers
Donald Griffin (Donald Griffin, brother of Billy Griffin, replaced original member Marv Tarplin, who left to tour and work with Smokey)

1978-1983
Dave Finley
Carl Cotton
Ronnie White
Bobby Rogers (Miracles Pete Moore & Billy Griffin retired from performing to focus on songwriting; Donald Griffin also leaves)

1993-1995
Sidney Justin (Carl Cotton leaves group; was murdered in 2003)
Dave Finley
Ronnie White
Bobby Rogers

1995-2001
Sidney Justin
Dave Finley
Bobby Rogers (original Miracle Ronnie White died in 1995)

2001-2003
Sidney Justin
Dave Finley
Tee Turner
Bobby Rogers

2003-2011 
Mark Scott* (replaced Sidney Justin; Alphonse Franklin filled in for Scott from June to December 2008)
Dave Finley
Tee Turner
Bobby Rogers
Claudette Robinson - special guest appearances

Timeline

 
Miracles